Bertie Gibbs (25 August 1878 –  29 December 1952) was a South African international rugby union player who played as a wing.

He made 1 appearance for South Africa in 1903.

References

South African rugby union players
South Africa international rugby union players
1878 births
1952 deaths
Rugby union wings
Rugby union players from Kimberley, Northern Cape
Griquas (rugby union) players